Umanka is a rural locality (a village) in Kacheganovsky Selsoviet, Miyakinsky District, Bashkortostan, Russia. The population was 22 as of 2010. There is 1 street.

Geography 
Umanka is located 23 km south of Kirgiz-Miyaki (the district's administrative centre) by road. Kacheganovo is the nearest rural locality.

References 

Rural localities in Miyakinsky District